Baseball is believed to have been introduced to Korea in 1905 by American missionaries during the Korean Empire, after which it gradually attained prominence. After the division of the Korean Peninsula into North Korea, backed by the Soviet Union and then-nascent People's Republic of China and South Korea, backed by the United States, in 1945 in the aftermath of World War II and the further destabilisation of the Korean War from 1950–53, baseball has become one of the most popular sports in South Korea. North Korea, under isolationist leadership, does not have the same level of investment in baseball as South Korea. There are 10 professional teams in South Korea's KBO League. Baseball season runs from March to October.

History

Before the Korean war
American missionaries brought baseball to Korea in the 19th century. In 1896, U.S. Marines played exhibitions against teams of Americans expatriates and the Seoul Athletic Club. The sport flourished in the period of Japanese rule.

In December 1921, a team of American Major League players stopped in Seoul during a tour of Asia, and a Korean team was assembled to play against them. The Koreans were defeated, 23-3. Various Korean cities also participated in the Japanese intercity baseball tournament, from its inception in 1927 until 1942. In 1940 and 1942 Seoul won the tournament, defeating (respectively) the teams of Dalian and Osaka. At least one Korean played against a Babe Ruth-led team of American all-stars which toured Japan in 1934.

Post-war period
The 1980s marked the beginning of the professional baseball era in South Korea. In 1982, the MBC Chungyong, Lotte Giants, Samsung Lions, OB Bears, Haitai Tigers, and Sammi Superstars were launched, as was the highest-level league that they composed, the Korea Baseball Championship. This league continues to be South Korea's major league, and has expanded to 10 teams.

The sport reached a new level of popularity when pitcher Chan Ho Park made his debut for the Los Angeles Dodgers in 1994.  Park achieved a great deal of success in his Major League Baseball career, and paved the way for the American success of fellow South Korean players such as Hee-seop Choi, Byung-hyun Kim, Bong Jung-keun, Shin-Soo Choo, Hyun-jin Ryu, and Jung-ho Kang.

It is also played widely on the local high school and collegiate level, as well as in a farm league (the Korea Baseball Futures League).

Baseball's South Korean governing body is the Korea Baseball Organization, a member of the International Baseball Federation and the organization responsible for the nation's participation in such international competitions such as the Olympics, World Baseball Classic and the Asian Games.  The KBO also manages Korea's highly successful national team. In the mid-2000s South Korea rose as a dominant power in the international baseball scene, twice placing second in the World Baseball Classic, and winning the bronze medal at the 2000 Summer Olympics in Sydney, Australia, and the gold medal against Cuba at the 2008 Summer Olympics in Beijing, China. Korea consistently places in the top of the WBSC World Rankings.

In popular culture

Films 
 YMCA Baseball Team: a semi-historical 2002 film about South Korea's first baseball team
 Glove: a 2011 film based on the true story of a fading baseball pro who is sent to coach baseball for deaf and hard of hearing children
 Perfect Game: a 2011 film based on the true story of the rivalry between Sun Dong-yeol of the Haitai Tigers and Choi Dong-won of the Lotte Giants in the 1980s

TV Drama 
 Hot Stove League: a 2019 South Korean television series that received critical acclaim and won Best Drama at the 56th Baeksang Arts Awards. The story of two managers whose goal is to move their baseball team from the bottom of the league to the top.

Music 
 NCT's 2021 album "Universe" features the title track "Universe (Let's Play Ball)", performed by the U subunit. It is inspired by the sport and the music video shows scenes of the group playing baseball.

See also

Baseball organizations and leagues 
 Korea Baseball Association
 Korea Baseball Organization
 KBO League
 Korea Baseball Futures League

Other related pages 
 Baseball cheering culture in South Korea
 High school baseball in South Korea
 South Korea national baseball team
 South Korea women's national baseball team

References